The Intramuros Consortium, established in 2002, is a non-profit, academic cooperation consisting of four prominent institutions of higher education located in Intramuros, Manila, Philippines. The colleges' libraries participate in an interlibrary loan program, allowing students, staff, and faculty to take advantage of all four campuses' collections. In addition, several academic projects and research programs are run by the Consortium jointly for the benefit of all four institutions.

Members

References

College and university associations and consortia in the Philippines
Education in Metro Manila
Consortium